New Statesmen was a "political superhero series" featured in British comic Crisis, created by John Smith and Jim Baikie, which lasted for fourteen episodes from 1988 to 1989.

Publication history
Sean Philips and Duncan Fegredo were brought in to cover for Jim Baikie on issues five, thirteen and fourteen and issues seven and eight, respectively.

New Statesmen, was the story which, along with Third World War, launched 2000 AD's sister comic Crisis.

The series was published in Crisis from issue #1–14 with a reappearance in issue #28. It was also repackaged for the American market as a five-issue prestige format limited series released in 1989. This had been part of the business plan for Crisis from the start but only the early series, like New Statesmen, got this treatment. In 1990 the story was collected into a trade paperback.

Plot
Set in America in 2047, the series told the story of a number of genetically modified "optimen", created with superhuman 'hard' and 'soft' talents, who were essentially biological weapons. Similar to contemporary comics such as Watchmen and The Dark Knight Returns, the series asked what 'superheroes' would be like if they were far more human than traditional heroes. The series depicted a dystopian future in which Britain had become the 51st state of America and the world is in the grip of fear of genetic engineering and political warmongering.

Publication
New Statesmen (by John Smith):
 "Halcyon Days" (with Jim Baikie, in Crisis, #1, 1988)
 "Perspectives" (with Jim Baikie, in Crisis, #2, 1988)
 "Behind the light" (with Jim Baikie, in Crisis, #3, 1988)
 "Shadowdancing" (with Jim Baikie, in Crisis, #4, 1988)
 "Downtime" (with Sean Phillips, in Crisis, #5, 1988)
 "Holding the fist" (with Sean Phillips, in Crisis, #6, 1988)
 "Where the railroad meets the sea" (with Duncan Fegredo, in Crisis #7, 1988)
 "Memories on Ice" (with Duncan Fegredo, in Crisis #8, 1988)
 "All doors lead to the Minotaur" (with Jim Baikie, in Crisis, ##9, 1989)
 "Life during wartime" (with Jim Baikie, in Crisis, ##10, 1989)
 "Riding the tiger" (with Jim Baikie, in Crisis, ##11, 1989)
 "The power and the glory" (with Jim Baikie, in Crisis, ##12, 1989)
 "White Death" (with Sean Phillips, in Crisis, #13-14, 1989)
 "Epilogue" (with Jim Baikie, in Crisis, ##28, 1989)

Collected editions
It was collected into a trade paperback:
New Statesmen (240 pages, Fleetway Quality, November 1990)

Notes

References

 New Statesmen at Barney
New Statesmen at the International Catalogue of Superheroes

Comics by John Smith (comics writer)
Crisis (Fleetway) comic strips